Salim Kallas (13 November 1936 − 2 December 2013) was a Syrian actor and politician.

A Damascus-native, Kallas worked at the national theater and at Syrian TV. He began his career in 1970 by participating in plays with university students, and then he worked at the national theater and later at the Syrian TV one year after it was established, where he made his television debut in a television film called "Asha'a al-Wada'a" (Farewell Dinner).

Salim Kallas started his career in theatre while at university, then later entering major theatre productions. Later when television started, Salim began his career as a television star in numerous shows and later on to films. Salim Kallas has five daughters and one son named Mohammed Kallas. His daughters currently live in Lebanon, Lina Kallas, Rania Kallas, Lotus Kallas, Shireen Kallas, and except for one who has moved to America Dima Kallas.

Kallas's acting career expanded on the stage, TV, cinema and radio. On the stage, he performed in Merchant of Venice and Macbeth, while on the radio he was a recurring performer in the popular radio series "Hokm al-Adala" (Rule of Justice).

While appearing in only in four cinematic movies, Kallas's TV career was expansive, which began with the long-running comedy series "Maraya" (Mirrors) in which he performed from its first season up to the most recent one, leading to a long career spanning all genres of Syrian TV shows and making him a mainstay of the medium and a popular figure.

Kallas died following a long illness on 2 December 2013, aged 77, in Damascus. He left behind his wife, a son and five daughters. His burial took place on the following day, 3 December.

Television
 Jawaher
 Maraya
 Harat Al Qasr
 Abjad Hawwaz
 Al bina'a 22
 Jedar Al Zaman
 Harb Al Sanawat Al Arba'a
 Had Al Saif
 Al-Khawali
 Layali Al-Salihiya
 Bab Al-Hara

Theatre
 Venice Merchant
 Macbeth
 False confessions (Al E'atarafat Al Kathebah)

Cinema
 Lail Al Rejal
 Naji Al Ali
 Short We Fanilla We Cap
 Wilad Al Amm

References

External links

1936 births
2013 deaths
Politicians from Damascus
Syrian male stage actors
20th-century Syrian politicians
Syrian male film actors
Syrian male television actors